Moscow Strikes Back (Razgrom Nemetskikh Voysk Pod Moskvoy, "Rout of the German troops near Moscow") is a Soviet war documentary about the Battle of Moscow made during the battle in October 1941 – January 1942, directed by Ilya Kopalin and . It was one of four films that won a 1942 Academy Award for Best Documentary Feature.

Plot

The film begins in Moscow, with civilians preparing defences in their streets. Men in civilian clothes with rifles prepare for battle. Women machine shell cases and prepare hand grenades. An apparently huge Stalin makes a battle speech in Red Square to thousands of cheering Red Army soldiers on parade with greatcoats, ushankas, and fixed bayonets.

Men, trucks, tanks, and artillery advance into battle. Anti-aircraft guns fire into the night sky, which is crisscrossed by searchlight beams. A crashed German bomber is seen in close-up. Russian fighters and bombers are readied and armed.

Artillery guns of many types fire many times. Tank crewmen scramble to their tanks and jump aboard. Tanks race across snow-covered plains towards the enemy. Snow camouflaged troops parachute behind enemy lines. They collect skis parachuted to them and go into battle, lying down under fire before attacking again.  Tanks rush from a forest across the snow, infantrymen riding on their rear decks or skiing into battle in large numbers. A tank is hit and explodes as the attack goes on. Russian infantry in greatcoats storm a village and clear the houses of surrendering German soldiers. Towns and cities are liberated. The Russian soldiers are greeted by smiling civilians. An old woman kisses several soldiers.

German atrocities are shown. The elegantly preserved houses of the playwright Anton Chekhov and the novelist Leo Tolstoy are seen badly damaged, the museum exhibits destroyed. The bodies of murdered civilians are shown. Quantities of destroyed German armour and transport are scattered across the landscape. Captured artillery is to be used against the Germans. The bodies of dead Germans are seen frozen in the snow. Maps show the extent of the Russian advance. The front line has retreated far from Moscow.

English version

The English version's narration was written by Albert Maltz, with uncredited writing by Jay Leyda, and Elliot Paul. The narration was voiced by Edward G. Robinson. It was distributed by Artkino Pictures and Republic Pictures.  The film was first shown in the New York on 15 August 1942 at the Globe Theatre. The New York Times credits it as: "Russian documentary produced by the Central Studios, Moscow, USSR; English commentary by Albert Maltz, narrated by Edward G. Robinson; editing and montage by Slavko Vorkapich; musical score arranged by Dimitri Tiomkin; released here through Artkino Pictures, Inc. At the Globe Theatre." Footage was included in Frank Capra's The Battle of Russia.

Reception

In 1942, the New York Times began its review with the words: 
"Out of the great Winter counter-offensive that began on Dec. 6 of last year on the approaches to Moscow, Russian front-line cameramen have brought a film that will live in the archives of our time. Moscow Strikes Back, now at the Globe, is not a film to be described in ordinary reviewer's terms, for these events were not staged before a camera and artistically arranged; they were recorded amidst a struggle that knew no quarter. Yet, here is a film to knot the fist and seize the heart with anger, a film that stings like a slap in the face of complacence, a scourge and lash against the delusion that there may still be an easy way out. Here is a film to lift the spirit with the courage of a people who have gone all-out."

The Times reviewer describes the film in detail, admitting that words are inadequate, and adds that "The savagery of that retreat is a spectacle to stun the mind." He finds "infinitely more terrible" the sight of the atrocities, "the naked and slaughtered children stretched out in ghastly rows, the youths dangling limply in the cold from gallows that were rickety, but strong enough." The review concludes that "To say that Moscow Strikes Back is a great film is to fall into inappropriate cliché." Slavko Vorkapich's editing is described as brilliant; Albert Maltz's writing as terse, Robinson's voice-over as moving, "but that does not tell the story of what the heroic cameramen have done", filming "amid the fury of battle".

Awards

In the USSR, the film was awarded the Stalin Prize. In America, it was one of four winners at the 15th Academy Awards for Best Documentary Feature. This was the USSR's first Oscar, awarded for the American cut of the film. This had been shortened by 14 minutes, recut, and re-narrated, without much of the Soviet ideology, from the Russian-language original. It gained an American audience of some 16 million. It also won the National Board of Review award for best documentary in 1942,  and New York Film Critics Circle Awards for Best War Fact Film.

See also

 Battle of Moscow (1985)
 Battle of Stalingrad

References

External links

 
 
 
 
 
 interview with Moscow Strikes Back front-line cameraman NewTimes.ru. February 19, 2007 
 http://cinemafirst.ru/razgrom-nemetskih-vojsk-pod-moskvoj-19/ 
Video, Public Domain
  (English language version)
 Nuclear Vault.  (English language version)
  Moscow Strikes Back at Музей ЦСДФ (Internet Museum of Central Studio for Documentary Film (CSDF))
   razgrom.nemeckih.voysk.pod.moskvoy.1942.avi at War Archeology (2015)
  
   - Duration: 1:06:21
 Moscow Strikes Back, 1942: (liveuser)

Soviet black-and-white films
Best Documentary Feature Academy Award winners
Soviet World War II propaganda films
1942 films
Soviet documentary films
1942 documentary films
Black-and-white documentary films
World War II films made in wartime
Cultural depictions of Joseph Stalin
Films shot in Moscow
Eastern Front of World War II films